Glengarry is a community in the Canadian province of Nova Scotia, located  in Pictou County. It is at the headwaters of the Middle River and on the Cape Breton and Northern Nova Scotia Railway line to Truro. It is now a small farming community but once had a railway station, post office, watering tank for steam locomotives supplied by water from the Middle River, and a school.

References
Glengarry on Destination Nova Scotia

Communities in Pictou County